Merge Magic! is a free-to-play puzzle adventure mobile game for Android and iOS.

References

Mobile games